Carlo Perrone (born 12 October 1960 in Rome) is an Italian professional football manager and a former player.

Career

Playing career
Perrone played 7 seasons (72 games) in the Serie A for S.S. Lazio, A.S. Roma and Ascoli Calcio 1898.

Coaching career
As a coach, he led A.S. Pescina Valle del Giovenco to promotion to 2009–10 Lega Pro Prima Divisione. The offseason was full of optimism and Paolo Rossi was hired as club's vice-president, but Perrone was fired after just 2 games in the new season.

On 26 July 2011 he was appointed head coach of Salerno, a newly refounded club of the historical local club Salernitana in Serie D. He guided Salerno Calcio to immediate promotion to Lega Pro Seconda Divisione, but was not confirmed for the 2012–13 campaign, as the board opted to hire Giuseppe Galderisi instead. He was called back on 20 September 2012, from the now named Salernitana, after the sacking of Galderisi.

References

1960 births
Living people
Italian footballers
Serie A players
Serie B players
S.S. Lazio players
A.S. Roma players
Ascoli Calcio 1898 F.C. players
U.S. Lecce players
U.S. Avellino 1912 players
U.S. Salernitana 1919 managers
Italian football managers
Association football defenders